Amblyeleotris diagonalis, the Diagonal shrimpgoby, is a species of goby native to the Indian Ocean and the western Pacific Ocean where it can be found on reefs at depths of from .  It is commensal with alpheid shrimps.  This species can reach a length of  SL.

References

External links

 Photograph
 

diagonalis
Fish described in 1979